The 1972 German Formula Three Championship was a multi-event motor racing championship for single-seat open wheel formula racing cars held across Europe. The championship featured drivers competing in two-litre Formula Three racing cars which conformed to the technical regulations, or formula, for the championship. It commenced on 2 April at Nürburgring and ended at Zolder on 17 September after eight rounds.

Willi Sommer became a champion. He won three races. Manfred Mohr finished as runner-up, winning the season opener and the season finale. Dieter Kern completed the top-three in the drivers' standings with wins at Nürburgring and Hockenheimring. Jochen Mass was the only other driver who was able to win a race in the season.

Calendar

Championship standings
Points are awarded as follows:

References

External links
 

German Formula Three Championship seasons
Formula Three season